Calvert is a city in Robertson County, Texas, United States.  As of the 2020 census, the city population was 962.  It is located approximately halfway between Waco and Bryan-College Station at the intersection of Texas State Highway 6 and Farm to Market Roads 1644 and 979, on the Southern Pacific line nine miles north of Hearne in west central Robertson County.  For the last 35 years, Calvert has enjoyed a relative success as an antique "capital". The town is named for Robert Calvert, an early settler who served in the Texas Legislature representing Robertson and Milam Counties.

History

Founding & coming of the railroads
The earliest known white settler in the area was Joseph Harlan, whose 1837 land grant laid five miles south of what is now the City of Calvert. In 1850, Robert Calvert, for whom the town was named, established a plantation west of the town. Calvert, who was a former Texas Representative and area farmer urged the Houston and Texas Central Railway to build through the area. The Houston and Texas Central Railroad agreed to stop in the town, at the encouragement of town leaders, in 1868.

In January 1868, a group of investors purchased land at the townsite and platted the community; by February of that year, merchants from the nearby communities including Sterling and Owensville were uprooting and moving to the community. A post office also opened in Calvert in 1868. The first trains arrived in Calvert in 1869, and the town was incorporated the next year with an aldermanic form of municipal government. Although the Stroud family owned most of the land, the town was named for Robert Calvert because he was a driving force behind getting the railroad to stop in the town. The order of election for the incorporation of Calvert was issued July 5, 1869, but a majority actually voted against incorporation. This election was set aside because it was believed that "a fair expression of the qualified voters was not had," and a new election was held Saturday, July 24, 1869, a majority voted for incorporation, and the town was ordered incorporated on August 13, 1869.

After the railroad made Calvert the major trading center of the area, it was reported that:  It was a common sight to see six or eight wagons drawn by oxen slowly passing through the one and only street of these towns en route to Houston to dispose of their cotton.  These wagons averaged ten miles a day.  The team-masters usually owned their teams and were paid so much per hundred pounds for hauling freight.

Named as county seat
In 1870, as Reconstruction sparked political maneuvering in Robertson County, the former county seat of Owensville was replaced by Calvert. The town had been briefly occupied by federal troops early in 1870. Just nine years later, however, the voters of Robertson County voted to move the county seat to nearby Morgan.

Development & decline
By 1871, the town claimed to have the largest cotton gin in the world. However, sources differ on when, exactly, the gin was built. The Handbook of Texas cites the 1871 date, while a 1931 Frontier Times piece on Calvert places the building of the gin by John H. Gibson as 1876. Eventually, P.C. and J.H. Gibson, Jr., took over the gin. It had 21 stands and a connected oil mill. The gin served a significant portion of the Brazos River bottoms. 32,000 bales were reported received in 1882.

In 1873 a severe yellow fever epidemic killed many in the community, severely depopulating the town. An early judge, in speaking about the epidemic, noted: The disease was brought to town by a traveling printer from Louisiana where the fever was raging.  He took a room over the restaurant in the Bailey building and died there.  As many persons as could made an exodus before the town was quarantined.  We lost between three and four hundred persons.  The fever was a terrible epidemic, and our people suffered because we did not know how to treat the disease.  The trains were not allowed to stop in Calvert then and the windows of the coaches were closed until they were far out of town.A county jail was built in 1875. By 1878, Calvert had 52 businesses. Today, the city of Calvert still exists as a Texas municipality. As of 2016, the town's mayor is Marcus D. Greaves.

Modern controversies
In December 2010, all three members of the town's police department resigned over a conflict with the city council.

In June 2015, a TV station reported that cities of Calvert, Franklin, Hearne, Lott in a "Texas Triangle" were using their police departments to issue numerous speeding tickets to turn their municipal court into a "cash cow".

Demographics

Calvert is part of the Bryan-College Station metropolitan area.

As of the 2020 United States census, there were 962 people, 585 households, and 470 families residing in the city.

As of the 2010 United States Census, there were 1,192 people, 509 households, and 374 families residing in the city. The population decreased to 1,180 residents in 2012. In 2010, the population density was 366.6 people per square mile (141.5/km), and there were 675 housing units at an average density of 186.6 per square mile (72.1/km).

The city's population was 36.7% White, 49.1% African American, 0.42% Native American, and 0.07% Asian. 8.77% of residents are from other races, and 1.47% are from two or more races. Hispanic or Latino residents of any race constitute 16.3% of the population.

Of the 584 households in the city, 27.4% of households had children under the age of 18, 34.7% were married couples living together, 25.4% were households led by single females, and 34.7% were non-related groups. 32.4% of all households in the city consisted of individuals and 16.6% of households were single people at least 65 years old. The average household size was 2.44 people and the average family size was 3.07 people.

20.7% of residents were under the age of 18, 7.1% were between the ages of 18 to 24, 21.9% were between 25 and 44, 22.1% were between 45 and 64, and 19.1% were at least 65 years of age. The median age was 38 years of age. For every 100 female residents there were 85.2 male residents, but for every 100 female residents age 18 and over, there were only 78.0 male residents.

The median household income was $18,105, and the median family income was $23,214. Median income for males was $24,722 and $17,885 for females. The per capita income for the city was $13,165. About 30.3% of families and 36.9% of the population are below the poverty line, including 53.4% of residents under age 18 and 32.6% of those age 65 or over.
Calvert's population decline is summarized below.

Attractions
 Calvert Historic District
 Katy Hamman-Stricker Women's Heritage Center – Historic library and museum honoring the efforts of the American Woman's League in Calvert.
 Calvert VFD Boss of The Toss Cornhole Tournament

Government
Calvert is served by Calvert Police Department, Calvert Fire Department, and Robertson County EMS. The city currently has a mayor and council form of government with a police chief, city attorney, and city secretary.

A former Calvert mayor, Briscoe Rowell Cain, Sr. (1931–2011), was the grandfather of Texas State Representative, House District 128, Republican Briscoe Cain, III, a lawyer from Harris County.

Education
The city's schools are part of the Calvert Independent School District.

Media
The Robertson County News reports the local news.

Photo gallery

Notable people
 Chalie Boy, rapper
 Tom Bradley, Mayor of Los Angeles, California from 1973 to 1993
 Rube Foster, baseball player, manager and pioneer executive in the Negro leagues; elected to the Baseball Hall of Fame in 1981
 Tex McCrary, originator of the talk-show format, radio personality, adviser to presidents
 Joe Sneed, U.S. federal judge

References

Further reading
 J. W. Baker, History of Robertson County, Texas (Franklin, Texas: Robertson County Historical Survey Committee, 1970).

External links
 City of Calvert – official website.
 Calvert Chamber of Commerce
 Texas Tourism 
 Handbook of Texas
 Ghost Town
 Calvert Tour of Homes

Cities in Texas
Cities in Robertson County, Texas
Bryan–College Station